The Argentina–Bolivia border is the international boundary between Argentina and Bolivia. From west to east, the border goes from the Altiplano to extend to the Chaco flat through the tropical environment of the Yungas.

Crossing points 

From east to west there are three main crossing points:

Villazón - La Quiaca (Horacio Guzmán International Bridge over La Quiaca River)
Bermejo - Aguas Blancas
Yacuiba - Profesor Salvador Mazza (Pocitos)

References 

 
Borders of Argentina
Borders of Bolivia
International borders